The large flowering plant genus Grewia  is today placed by most authors in the mallow family Malvaceae, in the expanded sense as proposed by in the APG. Formerly, it was placed in either the linden family (Tiliaceae) or the Sparrmanniaceae. However, these were both not monophyletic with respect to other Malvales - as already indicated by the uncertainties surrounding placement of Grewia and similar genera - and have thus been merged into the Malvaceae. Together with the bulk of the former Sparrmanniaceae, Grewia is in the subfamily Grewioideae and therein the tribe Grewieae, of which it is the type genus.

The genus was named by Carl Linnaeus, in honor of the botanist Nehemiah Grew (1641-1712) from England. Grew was one of the leading plant anatomists and microscope researchers of his time, and his study of pollen laid the groundwork for modern-day palynology.

List of Grewia species
The following species are accepted:

References

  (2007): Flowering Plant Families of the World. Firefly Books, Richmond Hill, Ontario, Canada. 

List
Grewia